Hancock County, Kentucky is a county located in the U.S. state of Kentucky. As of the 2020 census, the population was 9,095. Its county seat is in the city of Hawesville located in the Northern part of the county, and its largest city of Lewisport is located in the Northwestern part of the county. 

Hancock County is included in the Owensboro, KY Metropolitan Statistical Area.

The Hancock County Board of Education consists of 4 public school systems.  Hancock County High School (HCHS), Hancock County Middle School (HCMS), South Hancock Elementary School, & North Hancock Elementary School (NHES).  North Hancock Elementary School being the only one located in Lewisport.  NHES replaced the previously outdated Lewisport Elementary School with a newly constructed $8,829,532 building.

History
Hancock County was formed in 1829 from portions of Breckinridge, Daviess, and Ohio counties. The county is named for John Hancock, President of the Continental Congress and one of the signers of the Declaration of Independence.

The courthouse, the second to serve the county, was built in 1868 and renovated in 1978.

Geography
The northern border of the county lies along the Ohio River.

Adjacent counties
 Spencer County, Indiana  (northwest)
 Perry County, Indiana  (northeast)
 Breckinridge County  (southeast)
 Ohio County  (south)
 Daviess County  (west)

Demographics

As of the census of 2000, there were 8,392 people, 3,215 households, and 2,436 families residing in the county. The racial makeup of the county was 97.97% White, 0.85% Black or African American, 0.29% Native American, 0.17% Asian, 0.17% from other races, and 0.56% from two or more races.  0.76% of the population were Hispanic or Latino of any race.

There were 3,215 households, out of which 36.40% had children under the age of 18 living with them, 64.40% were married couples living together, 8.30% had a female householder with no husband present, and 24.20% were non-families. 21.20% of all households were made up of individuals, and 8.90% had someone living alone who was 65 years of age or older.  The average household size was 2.59 and the average family size was 3.01.

In the county, the population was spread out, with 26.70% under the age of 18, 8.50% from 18 to 24, 29.00% from 25 to 44, 24.90% from 45 to 64, and 11.00% who were 65 years of age or older.  The median age was 36 years. For every 100 females, there were 97.50 males.  For every 100 females age 18 and over, there were 95.80 males.

The median income for a household in the county was $36,914, and the median income for a family was $42,994. Males had a median income of $35,294 versus $23,574 for females. The per capita income for the county was $16,623.  About 11.40% of families and 13.60% of the population were below the poverty line, including 18.00% of those under age 18 and 15.80% of those age 65 or over.

Communities

Incorporated
 Hawesville (county seat)
 Lewisport

Unincorporated

 Adair
 Cabot
 Chambers
 Dukes
 Easton
 Floral
 Goering
 Patesville
 Pellville
 Petri
 Roseville
 Skillman
 Utility
 Waitman
 Weberstown
 Boling Chapel

Politics

References

External links
 Hancock Clarion newspaper website
 County website
 Hancock's Chamber of Commerce website

 
Kentucky counties
Kentucky counties on the Ohio River
1829 establishments in Kentucky
Populated places established in 1829
Owensboro metropolitan area